Novoalexandrovka is a rural locality (a selo) in Krasnenskoye Rural Settlement, Paninsky District, Voronezh Oblast, Russia. The population was 230 as of 2010. There are 2 streets.

Geography 
Novoalexandrovka is located 11 km north of Panino (the district's administrative centre) by road. Perelyoshino is the nearest rural locality.

References 

Rural localities in Paninsky District